This is a list of Mumbai Football Club's managers and their records, from 2007, when the first ever manager was appointed, to the present day.

Statistics
Information correct as of 19 December 2011. Only competitive matches are counted. Wins, losses and draws are results at the final whistle; the results of penalty shoot-outs are not counted.

 
Mumbai